Mesocrambus canariensis is a species of moth in the family Crambidae. It is found on the Canary Islands. Some authors list it as a synonym of Mesocrambus tamsi.

References

Moths described in 1987
Crambinae